Cais do Sodré is a station on the Green Line of the Lisbon Metro.  It is located in the Praça Duque da Terceira, connecting to the Cais do Sodré railway station and with a boat station (allowing for quick travel between Lisbon and Cacilhas, Seixal and Montijo.

History
This metro station was built by Pedro Botelho and Nuno Teotónio Pereira and the art work was done by António Dacosta, which left some of his drawings to be used in the station after his death, with some help from the painter Pedro Morais.

This station won both the Valmor and Municipal Architecture prizes in 2008.

Connections

Urban buses

Carris 
 15E Praça da Figueira ⇄ Algés
 18E Cais do Sodré ⇄ Cemitério da Ajuda
 201 Cais do Sodré ⇄ Linda-a-Velha (morning service)
 202 Cais do Sodré ⇄ Bairro Padre Cruz (morning service)
 206 Cais do Sodré ⇄ Bairro Padre Cruz (morning service)
 207 Cais do Sodré ⇄ Fetais (morning service)
 208 Cais do Sodré ⇄ Estação Oriente (Interface) (morning service)
 210 Cais do Sodré ⇄ Prior Velho (morning service)
 706 Cais do Sodré ⇄ Estação Santa Apolónia
 714 Praça da Figueira ⇄ Outurela
 728 Restelo - Av. das Descobertas ⇄ Portela - Av. dos Descobrimentos
 732 Marquês de Pombal ⇄ Caselas
 735 Cais do Sodré ⇄ Hospital de Santa Maria
 736 Cais do Sodré ⇄ Odivelas (Bairro Dr. Lima Pimentel)
 758 Cais do Sodré ⇄ Portas de Benfica
 760 Gomes Freire ⇄ Cemitério da Ajuda 
 781 Cais do Sodré ⇄ Prior Velho
 782 Cais do Sodré ⇄ Praça José Queirós

Aerobus 
 Linha 1 Aeroporto ⇄ Cais do Sodré

Rail

Comboios de Portugal 
 Lisboa - Cais do Sodré ⇄ Oeiras
 Lisboa - Cais do Sodré ⇄ Cascais

Boat

Transtejo 
 Cais do Sodré ⇄ Cacilhas
 Cais do Sodré ⇄ Montijo
 Cais do Sodré ⇄ Seixal

See also
 List of Lisbon metro stations

References

External links

Green Line (Lisbon Metro) stations
Railway stations opened in 1998